Armin Ganz (March 26, 1948 – October 9, 1995) was an American production designer. He was nominated for an Academy Award in the category Best Art Direction for the film Tucker: The Man and His Dream.

Ganz died of a heart attack on his houseboat in Sausalito.

Selected filmography
 Tucker: The Man and His Dream (1988)

References

External links

1948 births
1995 deaths
American production designers
People from Knoxville, Tennessee